Zeynab Habib (born Oloukèmi Zeynab Abibou; September 25, 1975) is a Beninese Yoruba singer of world music born in Abidjan, Ivory Coast. She won the Kora Awards in 2005 in the Category  Best Female Artist in West Africa and has been Unicef's National Goodwill Ambassador since 2007.

Biography
Zeynab's father was an electronics engineer and her mother was a trader. She is the eighth child to her parents and was raised in a large Muslim family with more than 16 other siblings.

Growing up, Zeynab engaged herself in music related school competitions. She later enrolled at the General Education College of Allada in 1993. Although she completed the series A at her senior secondary school, she dropped out to pursue a career in music. She then started to make local stage appearances including hosting a Karaoke Bar at the Alex's Hotel in Cotonou, Benin for more than a year.

Zeynab received international recognition for her music including from UNICEF. As of October 2015, she was the national ambassador for UNICEF in Benin. 

During a music recital in 2005, she caught the attention of the Super Quartz orchestra who later recruited her to sing for them. This opened up opportunity for her to meet and partner with notable musicians of that time including Fifi Rafiatou, Awilo Logomba, Jacky Rapon, Jimmy Hope, Nel Oliver (Fespam, Congo), Back Médio, KiriKanta and Madou Isbat.

References

Beninese women singers
1975 births
Living people
People from Abidjan
Ivorian emigrants to Benin
Yoruba women musicians
Beninese Muslims
Ivorian Muslims
UNICEF Goodwill Ambassadors